Events from the year 1569 in France.

Incumbents 
Monarch – Charles IX of France

Events
 
 
 
 
 
 
 September – A Royalist army under the Duc d'Anjou and Marshal Tavannes forces Coligny to abandon the siege of Poitiers.
 October 3 – Battle of Moncountour: The Royalist forces of Tavannaes and Anjou defeat Coligny's Huguenots.
 The trade compact of 1536 is renewed, exempting French merchants from Ottoman law and allowing them to travel, buy and sell throughout the sultan's dominions and to pay low customs duties on French imports and exports.

Births
 

 
 March 13 – Louis, Prince of Condé, French Protestant general (b. 1530)

Deaths

See also

References

1560s in France